Robert Leonard Outhwaite, (1868-6 November 1930), known as R. L. Outhwaite, was a radical British Liberal Party politician, Member of Parliament and leading advocate of land reform.

Background
He was born in Tasmania in 1868. He spent his early life in country pursuits. He was married and had one son. He died on 6 November 1930.

Political career
He contested West Birmingham at the 1906 General Election, against the leading Unionist politician Joseph (Jo) Chamberlain;

He then contested the Horsham division of Sussex at the General Election in January 1910. He did not contest the General Election of December 1910. He was a friend of Josiah Wedgwood, the Liberal MP for Newcastle-under-Lyme. Like Wedgwood, he was a strong advocate of the Single Tax policy that was central to David Lloyd George's future Land Campaign. In 1912, when a by-election vacancy occurred in Hanley, Staffordshire, Wedgwood persuaded Outhwaite to put himself forward to be Liberal candidate. The seat had been Liberal until the MP Enoch Edwards decided to switch allegiance to the Labour Party in 1909. Since then he had held the seat at both 1910 elections under his new label, before dying in 1912. Outhwaite campaigned heavily in support of Lloyd George's Land tax policies, which were very successful in not only regaining the seat for the Liberals, but in reducing the Labour candidate to a poor third place.

When First World War broke out in 1914, Outhwaite's pacifist views put him at odds with both his local Liberal association and then with Lloyd George, who took over as Prime Minister in 1916. Outhwaite sought re-election at Hanley in 1918 but he had to describe himself as an Independent Liberal, because the local Liberal association had replaced him as their candidate. When the Lloyd George-led Coalition government was handing out 'coupons', the official endorsement went to a National Democrat candidate, who gained the seat. Outhwaite finished in a poor third place;

After the election, Outhwaite, along with his old friend, Wedgwood, joined the Labour Party, founding the Hanley branch of the Independent Labour Party. He did not stand for parliament again.

In 1917 he published a book, The Land or Revolution. In 1919 he co-founded the Commonwealth League.

In the 1920s, Outhwaite (as "Leonard Outhwaite) was a member of the Bureau of Industrial Research based in New York City.

References

External links
 

1868 births
1930 deaths
Independent Labour Party politicians
Liberal Party (UK) MPs for English constituencies
People from Tasmania
UK MPs 1910–1918
Georgist politicians